Christ Episcopal Church and Cemetery is an historic Episcopal church and cemetery located at Cambridge, Dorchester County, Maryland U.S.A.

History 
Christ Church is the parish church of Great Choptank Parish, founded in 1692 as one of the List of original 30 Anglican parishes in the Province of Maryland.

The church structure, designed by noted Baltimore architect Charles E. Cassell and built between 1883 and 1884, is a large Gothic Revival stone structure of green serpentinite stone on a cruciform plan.  The adjoining cemetery is enclosed on three sides by a brick wall, and burials therein date from 1674 to the present. Church parishioners included five governors of Maryland, a state Attorney General, an Ambassador to the Netherlands, local judges and lawyers and several U.S. Congressmen, where most are buried.

Christ Episcopal Church and Cemetery was listed on the National Register of Historic Places in 1984.

Notable interments

Maryland governors 
John Henry (1797–98)
Charles Goldsborough (1819)
Henry Lloyd (1885–88)
Phillips Lee Goldsborough (1912–16)
Emerson C. Harrington (1916–20).

Other 
Robert Goldsborough-delegate to the Continental Congress.
William A. Sulivane-State Boundary Commissioner for Dorchester County (appointed 1865). Grandson of James Sulivane.
Congressman Daniel Maynadier Henry

References

External links 
, including undated photo, at Maryland Historical Trust
Christ Episcopal Church website

Churches on the National Register of Historic Places in Maryland
Churches completed in 1884
19th-century Episcopal church buildings
Episcopal church buildings in Maryland
Gothic Revival church buildings in Maryland
Anglican cemeteries in the United States
Churches in Dorchester County, Maryland
Cambridge, Maryland
National Register of Historic Places in Dorchester County, Maryland